The 2022 Tailteann Cup was the inaugural edition of the Tailteann Cup and is the  second-tier of Gaelic football for senior county teams (the All-Ireland Senior Football Championship is the first-tier trophy). It was contested by up to sixteen teams from Divisions 3 and 4 of the 2022 National Football League plus New York. Division 3 or 4 teams initially competed in their provincial championship and if they reached their provincial final, they continued in the 2022 All-Ireland Senior Football Championship, progressing to the All-Ireland Qualifiers, whereas if they were beaten in their provincial final, they did not participate in the 2022 Tailteann Cup.

The final was played on 9 July 2022 at Croke Park in Dublin, between Cavan and Westmeath. Westmeath won after a 2–14 to 1–13 defeat of Cavan.

Format
The inaugural Tailteann Cup was contested by seventeen teams: the sixteen set to play in Divisions 3 and 4 of the 2023 National Football League, plus New York. These teams could only have qualified for the Tier 1 All-Ireland Championship, the Sam Maguire Cup, if they had reached their provincial final. The Sam Maguire Cup was contested by the sixteen teams set to play in Divisions 1 and 2 of the 2023 National Football League.

Louth and Limerick qualified for the Sam Maguire Cup as a result of winning promotion from Division 3 to Division 2 for 2023, while Down and Offaly competed in the Tailteann Cup as a result of being relegated from Division 2 to Division 3 for 2023.

The 2022 Tailteann Cup was a straight knockout format, with two preliminary-round games and seven first-round games followed by quarter-finals, semi-finals and a final. New York received a bye to the quarter-finals. The seventeen teams were organised on a geographical basis, with eight assigned to a northern section and nine to a southern section (including New York). The eight northern teams were drawn against each other in four of the seven first-round games. Four of the southern teams were drawn in two preliminary-round games, with the two winners then joining the remaining four teams in three first-round games. All seven first-round winners joined New York (who were assigned to the southern section) in the quarter-finals, with pairings decided via an open draw within each geographic section. The semi-final pairings were then decided via an open draw.

From 2023, the Tailteann Cup is set to be played on a round-robin basis, with the first round consisting of four groups of four teams with no geographical structure.

Team allocation

Teams
None of the seventeen teams qualified for their provincial final. Doing so would have resulted in them competing in the Tier 1 Sam Maguire Cup instead.

Bracket
There was an open draw for all rounds, including quarter-finals and semi-finals. It was split into N (north) and S (south) sections until semi finals. Both sections then combined. The first team pulled out received home advantage. The semi-finals and final were played in Croke Park.

Preliminary round
New York were granted a bye to the quarter-finals. Fourteen teams competed in round one to complete the quarter-final line-up. A preliminary round was held to reduce the number of eligible teams from sixteen to fourteen.

Round 1

Quarter-finals
New York joined the seven Round 1 winners:

Semi-finals

Final

Championship statistics

Top scorer: overall

Top scorer: single game

Scoring events
All records exclude extra-time.
Widest winning margin: 15 points
 Offaly 3-17 - 0-11 New York (quarter-final)
Most goals in a match: 5
Wexford 2-13 - 3-11 Offaly (preliminary round)
Westmeath 3-22 - 2-16 Offaly (semi-final)
Most points in a match: 38
Westmeath  3-22 - 2-16 Offaly (semi-final)
Most goals by one team in a match: 3
Wicklow 3-16 - 1-10 Waterford (preliminary round)
Wexford 2-13 - 3-11 Offaly (preliminary round)
Offaly 3-17 - 0-11 New York (quarter-final)
Westmeath 3-22 - 2-16 Offaly (semi-final)
Most points by one team in a match: 24
Cavan 0-24 - 1-12 Down (round 1)
Highest aggregate score: 53 points
Westmeath 3-22 - 2-16 Offaly (semi-final)
Lowest aggregate score: 27 points
Longford 0-12 - 1-12 Fermanagh (Round 1)

Miscellaneous
 The meeting between Wicklow and Waterford was the first ever game in the Tailteann Cup, with the former winning by 3-16–1-10.
 The Quarter Final meeting between Offaly and New York was the first Championship meeting between the sides.
 This meeting was the first meeting of a non-Connacht team for New York since their admission to the All-Ireland Senior Football Championship in 1999.
 The meeting of Offaly and New York was New York's first Championship game in Ireland since the 2001 All Ireland Senior Football Championship where they lost 3-13–1-09 to Roscommon in Dr Hyde Park, Roscommon.

See also
 2022 All-Ireland Senior Football Championship
 Gaelic Athletic Association

References

External links
 GAA.ie

Tailteann Cup
Tailteann Cup